Yasinovo (Yasin) is a rural locality (a village) in Novomeshcherovsky Selsoviet, Mechetlinsky District, Bashkortostan, Russia. The population was 164 as of 2010. There is 1 street.

Geography 
Yasinovo is located 44 km south of Bolsheustyikinskoye (the district's administrative centre) by road. Novomereshchevo is the nearest rural locality.

References 

Rural localities in Mechetlinsky District